Lai Yi Hsin (born 8 November 1988) is a Taiwanese archer representing Chinese Taipei, who won the bronze medal in the team competition at the 2006 Asian Games.

References 

Living people
1988 births
Taiwanese female archers
Place of birth missing (living people)
Asian Games medalists in archery
Archers at the 2006 Asian Games
Asian Games bronze medalists for Chinese Taipei
Medalists at the 2006 Asian Games
21st-century Taiwanese women